Wang Uk may refer to:

Daejong of Goryeo (died 969), Taejo's son and Seongjong's father
Anjong of Goryeo (died 996), Taejo's son and Hyeonjong's father
Heonjong of Goryeo (1084–1097), king of Goryeo